The Fukuoka International Women's Cup is a tennis tournament in Fukuoka, Japan, played on outdoor carpet courts. Held since 2001, this ITF Circuit event is a $60,000 tournament.

Past finals

Singles

Doubles

External links
 Official website 

 
ITF Women's World Tennis Tour
Tennis tournaments in Japan
Sport in Fukuoka
Carpet court tennis tournaments
Recurring sporting events established in 2001
2001 establishments in Japan